Guo Lanying (born December 1929 in Pingyao, Shanxi) is a noted Chinese operatic soprano best known for singing patriotic songs such as "My Motherland" (1956) and "Nanniwan" (1943).

She was born into a poor family in Pingyao, central Shanxi, and began studying Shanxi bangzi, a form of local opera, at the age of six. She performed with the local theatrical troupe in Taiyuan, the provincial capital, at the age of 11.

In the 1940s, she majored in opera at North China United University (华北联合大学), and performing with that university's Song and Dance Troupe. With that troupe, she performed many dance dramas.

Following the Chinese Revolution Guo became the chief performer in the Song and Dance Theatre of the Central Conservatory of Music, Central Experimental Opera, and China Opera House. She played the leading roles in many new operas, including The White Haired Girl and The Marriage of Little Er Hei. In the 1960s she appeared in the film ''The East Is Red.

Along with the singer Wang Kun, she was a member of the first generation of Chinese performing artists to train overseas. She visited the Soviet Union, Romania, Poland, Czechoslovakia, Yugoslavia, Italy, Japan, and other nations.

Guo retired in 1982, continuing to teach at the China Conservatory of Music in Beijing. In 1986 she established the Guo Lanying Art School in Guangdong.

References

External links
Guo Lanying article

See also
Wang Kun (singer)

1929 births
Living people
Chinese women singers
People from Jinzhong
Chinese sopranos
Singers from Shanxi
Educators from Shanxi
Delegates to the 1st National People's Congress
Delegates to the 2nd National People's Congress
Delegates to the 3rd National People's Congress
Delegates to the 5th National People's Congress
Delegates to the 6th National People's Congress
Delegates to the National People's Congress from Shanxi